Sonia Álvarez (born 10 April 1976) is a Puerto Rican swimmer. She competed in two events at the 1996 Summer Olympics.

References

External links
 

1976 births
Living people
Puerto Rican female swimmers
Olympic swimmers of Puerto Rico
Swimmers at the 1996 Summer Olympics
Place of birth missing (living people)
Central American and Caribbean Games gold medalists for Puerto Rico
Central American and Caribbean Games medalists in swimming
Competitors at the 2002 Central American and Caribbean Games